Tarquin (Latin Tarquinius) may refer to:

 Tarquin (opera), a chamber opera

Given name
 Lucius Tarquinius Priscus or Tarquin the Elder (died 579 BC), fifth of the seven legendary kings of Rome
 Lucius Tarquinius Superbus or Tarquin the Proud (died 496 BC), last of the seven legendary kings of Rome
 Sextus Tarquinius, son of Tarquin the Proud, of the Tarquin and Lucretia story
 Tarquin Hall (born 1969), British writer and journalist
 Tarquin Gotch, entertainment industry veteran
 Tarquin Blackwood, a fictional character from The Vampire Chronicles
 General Tarquin, a character from the webcomic The Order of the Stick
 Tarquin Fin-tim-lin-bin-whin-bim-lim-bus-stop-F'tang-F'tang-Olé-Biscuitbarrel, character from the Monty Python sketch Election Night Special
 Tarquin, Sheridan's boyfriend on the TV series Keeping Up Appearances

Surname
 Brian Tarquin (21st century), American guitarist
 Didier Tarquin (born 1967), French cartoonist and scenarist

Fictional
Tarquin, a telepathic alien from the episode "Exile" of the science-fiction television series Star Trek: Enterprise.

See also
Tarkin (disambiguation)